Andrii Kulyk (born 1998) is a Ukrainian wrestler. He is a bronze medallist of the World Wrestling Championships.

Career
Kulyk's first senior international championship was the 2020 European Championships in Rome, Italy, where he lost in his very first bout against Hungary's Róbert Fritsch.

The following year was more successful for Kulyk. He won a silver medal at the 2021 European U23 Championship in Skopje, North Macedonia, where he lost in the final to Malkhas Amoyan from Armenia. He also participated at the 2021 U23 World Championships in Belgrade, Serbia, and managed to reach the quarterfinals (after defeating Francesco Bellino from Italy and Andrei Kavaleuski from Belarus, but losing to Shant Khachatryan from Armenia).

Kulyk participated at the 2022 World Wrestling Championships, being awarded a bronze medal in the men's Greco-Roman 72 kg event. Though he lost to the eventual World Champion Ali Arsalan representing Serbia, he first defeated Róbert Fritsch from Hungary and Kristupas Šleiva from Lithuania, and then narrowly won in the bronze medal bout against Ibrahim Ghanem from France. That season, Kulyk also won a bronze medal of the Grand Prix Zagreb Open, while his teammate and Olympic silver medallist Parviz Nasibov was victorious.

References

External links 
 

Living people
Place of birth missing (living people)
1998 births
Ukrainian male sport wrestlers
World Wrestling Championships medalists
21st-century Ukrainian people